W.I.T.C.H. (stylised as W.i.t.c.h.) is an Italian fantasy Disney comics series created by Elisabetta Gnone, Alessandro Barbucci, and Barbara Canepa. The series features a group of five teenage girls who become the guardians of the classical elements of energy, water, fire, earth, and air, and protectors of the mythical Kandrakar, the center of the universe. The story follows them as they handle their new magical powers and responsibilities, as well as their lives as adolescents. The comics art style draws heavy inspiration from manga and its drawing conventions.

The series was first published by Disney Italy in April 2001. The final issue of W.I.T.C.H. was released in October 2012, concluding the series' 139 issue run.

The comics spawned a franchise with a variety of printed media, including both reprinted and original content, as well as audiovisual media. The first two arcs (The Twelve Portals and Nerissa's Revenge) were loosely adapted into an animated series, itself influenced by anime, which aired from 2004 to 2006. In 2005, a video game based on the franchise was released in Europe, and in 2007 a soundtrack album including theme songs for the TV series as well as music inspired by the comics was released.

In 2004, series creators Alessandro Barbucci and Barbara Canepa unsuccessfully sued Disney for rights to W.I.T.C.H. after issues with management at the publishing company. As a result, Canepa founded her own comics company.

Background and production
Upon seeing the success of PKNA - Paperinik New Adventures with young male audiences, some of the writers began thinking of a similar concept that would work for young female audiences. Elisabetta Gnone, Alessandro Barbucci and Barbara Canepa came up with the original concepts and designs. Gnone co-wrote the first issue of the series with Francesco Artibani. Gnone and Artibani originally created a concept that would last nine issues, but upon seeing the impressive sales numbers, a further three issues were ordered, rounding out the 12-issue first saga.

In 2004, tensions arose between the W.I.T.C.H. artists and Disney's publishing (Buena Vista). Series creators Barbucci and Canepa unsuccessfully sued Disney for the initial rights to W.I.T.C.H., with Artibani acting as a witness in support of the two artists in court. After the lawsuit failed, Artibani and other artists decided to end their working relationships with Disney due to the "difficult management and company".

After breaking off with Buena Vista and in the middle of her trial against them, Canepa created her own comic book company, Soleil. She described it as a way to become "more sincere and uncensored" with her comics. Soleil was unable to secure the rights to W.I.T.C.H. from Disney, and instead focused on original projects. Canepa stated that she intended to keep all the rights to her comics; she said, "After my experience with Disney, it's important for me to protect myself."

Around the same time as the rights trial, Disney filed an unsuccessful copyright infringement lawsuit against Rainbow SpA, the studio behind Winx Club (a series cited as the main competition for W.I.T.C.H.). In its April 2004 suit, the corporation claimed the Winx Club concept copied that of W.I.T.C.H.; all of the claims were rejected in August, when Rainbow SpA won the case against Disney by providing proof that Winx Club production began before the W.I.T.C.H. comic was available.

Characters 

The main characters are the five current Guardians (with respective elemental powers in parentheses):

Wilhelmina "Will" Vandom (energy)
Irma Lair (water)
Taranee Cook (fire)
Cornelia Hale (earth)
Hay Lin (air)

Each of the five Guardians' powers are fueled by Kandrakar itself, and transmitted to the Heart via the Aurameres, the physical representations of the five elements in the forms of colored orbs. The Aurameres grant the same powers to each generation of Guardians.

When the Guardians transform, they change form and grow wings. The wings do not allow them to fly (except for Hay Lin), but after they get the New Powers they can all fly.

Setting

Heatherfield 
Located on Earth, this city is the home of the five Guardians.

Kandrakar
A sacred, ethereal, spiritual world in the very center of the entire universe itself, where time and space do not exist. In the Fortress, the wisest of thousands of other planets and worlds are gathered to discuss the state of the worlds which are of their concern. They simply observe and do not interfere. The fifth and last Guardian is rightful Keeper of the mystical Heart of Kandrakar, an ancient and immensely powerful crystal orbicular pendant which gives the girls' their ability to transform into their taller, stronger and more elaborate Guardian costumes. Hay Lin's paternal grandmother lives here with the Oracle when she "dies" unexpectedly on Earth.

Metamoor 
Metamoor is a world ruled by the Escanor, who originates from Earth. For a long time Metamoor, and its capital Meridian, was isolated from the rest of the universe because it was ruled by the evil prince Phobos. With help of the Guardians and the Meridian people the rightful heiress to the throne, Elyon, could reign again. Elyon is the last of the Escanor.

Arkhanta 
Arkhanta is an Earth-like world ruled by Ari. Ari accused the Oracle for not wanting to cure his son. Even the banshee Yua was unable to help him. With trickery, Ari could keep Yua in his scarlet citadel forever. Despite all this, Ari brought prosperity to his people. Knowing they had received everything thanks to the powers of Yua, the people are both happy and disturbed. Fortunately, after the Guardians released Yua and healed Ari's son Maqui, any threat of Yua's anger was over. On his turn Ari ended his hostility against Kandrakar.

Basiliade
Basiliade is the home world of the Oracle (Himerish), Endarno, and Orube. It makes up part of a binary solar system.

Comics

Part I: The Twelve Portals 
The first saga introduced a world called Metamoor, ruled by a tyrannical ruler named Prince Phobos. Years ago, Prince Phobos caused the disappearances of his parents and took over the capital city of Metamoor, Meridian. To prevent him from spreading tyranny throughout the universe, the Oracle - the ruler of Kandrakar - lowered a veil over the planet, separating Metamoor from the rest of the universe under Kandrakar's protection. However, twelve portals opened between Meridian and Earth, creating a series of passageways for the desperate refugees and monsters of Meridian to infiltrate Earth. The portals also weakened the veil; in order to prevent its total collapse, generations of Guardians were sent to protect it. In the present day, five girls are chosen to become the new Guardians: Will Vandom, the Guardian of Energy and the Keeper of the Heart; Irma Lair, the new Guardian of Water; Taranee Cook, the Guardian of Fire; Cornelia Hale, the Guardian of Earth; and Hay Lin, the Guardian of Air. Together, they must prevent the collapse of the veil and promote justice throughout the universe under the guidance of the Oracle of Kandrakar.

The first saga also introduced Elyon Brown, a childhood friend of Cornelia. The Guardians' first mission was to close the twelve portals, but as they found out for themselves, Elyon had betrayed them. It is revealed that Elyon is Prince Phobos's younger sister who had disappeared from Meridian more than a decade ago. After Prince Phobos's right-hand man, Lord Cedric, revealed Elyon of her true alien heritage, he manipulated her into thinking that the Guardians were her enemies. The Guardians had to find a way to defeat Prince Phobos and bring Elyon back home. In Meridian, however, there is a rebellion taking place led by Caleb, whom Cornelia had seen in her dreams for years. They sought to overthrow Prince Phobos and put Elyon on the throne, as she is the legitimate ruler. The Guardians later worked together with the rebels and eventually, Elyon realized her mistake for trusting Lord Cedric. Prince Phobos had planned to absorb his sister's powers for himself during her coronation, but with the Guardians' help Elyon escaped and later battled against him for the crown. The final battle was successful, but not without some losses. Prince Phobos transformed Caleb back into a crystal flower, his most primitive form as a Murmurer. This devastated Cornelia greatly to the point where it would haunt her in the next series. As Elyon is crowned Queen and the Light of Meridian, the world of Metamoor is finally liberated. The Oracle lifted the veil off of Metamoor and light shines on the world once again. Both Prince Phobos and Cedric are imprisoned in the Tower of Mist.

Part II: Nerissa's Revenge 
The Guardians must face an old enemy of Kandrakar – Nerissa, the corrupted ex-Guardian and the previous Keeper of the Heart. When the Oracle realized how the immense power of the Heart was corrupting Nerissa, he took it away from her and gave it to Cassidy, the former Guardian of Water. Obsessed with her lost power and blinded by jealousy, Nerissa tricked Cassidy and killed her. As punishment, Nerissa was stripped of her magic and sentenced to sleep, alone and friendless, in Mount Thanos for an eternity, only until all five elements-Water, Fire, Earth, Air and Pure/Absolute Energy- united into one single being.

When Cornelia accidentally, and unknowingly, absorbed all five elements into herself, the seal on Nerissa's tomb broke, setting her free. When Caleb is kidnapped, the Guardians must face Nerissa along with her four Knights of Vengeance. While successful in their rescue mission, they end up losing Luba who sacrificed herself to save them. Hoping to steal the Heart she craved for so long, Nerissa later attacked the girls through their dreams in order to weaken them but failed. She was later successful in stealing the Heart back by tricking Will into giving it to her.

With the very symbol and essence of Kandrakar itself now entirely corrupted by Nerissa's hatred and vengeance, the former Guardian leader and her Knights of Vengeance attacked the sacred Temple of Kandrakar itself. Will later acquired the Star of Cassidy, a copy of the mystical Heart from the spirit/ghost of Cassidy, the late and original Guardian of Water. With it, Will and her fellow Guardians faced Nerissa in Kandrakar. In the final battle, Nerissa was ultimately destroyed by the combined strength of the second generation of Guardians. Despite their victory, Cornelia is deeply heartbroken when Caleb left her due to their complicated relationship.

Part III: A Crisis on Both Worlds 
Crisis after crisis threatens to break up the girls once and for all. Will's father, Thomas Vandom, returns into her life after years of absence, and his intentions are anything but loving and trustful. Later, Taranee went on strike because she felt that the Oracle is using them to carry out his missions and sentences. A new character, Orube, joins the remaining Guardians on their new mission to defeat a new enemy; Ari, the powerful lord of Arkhanta and they must prevent him from rising and destroying the Oracle. Ari's son, Maqi, suffered from a strange disorder since birth and the Oracle had refused to help Ari cure his son. Angered and blinded by rage, Ari captured a banshee, named Yua, and tried to use her wish-granting power to oppose the Oracle and Kandrakar (but it could not be done). The longer Yua was held prisoner and serving as Ari's slave, the more powerful Ari becomes, and soon, he would have enough power to overthrow the Oracle.

Taranee later rejoined the quintet and together, they were able to defeat Ari and set Yua free. Liberated, Yua kidnapped Maqi because she wanted Ari to suffer for holding her imprisoned for many years against her will. Ari and the Guardians followed her into the swamp where she and her banshee sisters live and fought them to bring Maqi back. However, Maqi was nearly killed during the confusion of the battle. He was later saved and cured when the Guardians and Orube offered their magical, elemental gifts from the nymph Xin Jing herself to him.

Although their missions on the world Arkhanta was successful, the girls have a whole bunch of new problems on Earth that needs their attention: Interpol discovers the secret of the five Guardians' and wants to capture them and use their astounding abilities as Guardians of Kandrakar for their dark intentions. As if that was not enough, the girls' Astral Drops decide to rebel after months of being taken advantage of by the Guardians. The Astral Drops started to cause numerous problems between the Guardians' families, teachers, and individual boyfriends' and eventually they ran away to another city. The Guardians later recaptured the Astral Drops and decided to liberate them from slavery by sending to another city entirely.

Part IV: Trial of the Oracle 
The members of the Congregation are questioning the Oracle's recent actions, and he shocked everyone by putting himself on trial. The Guardians are called in to recall his recent unsatisfactory deeds and he was later found guilty by Endarno and was banished back into his home world, Basilíade. Back home in Heatherfield, Will confronted Orube and Matt, while Principal Knickerbocker goes to drastic measures to raise the girls' grades at Sheffield. In Kandrakar, the Council has elected Endarno the new Oracle. After Endarno has been chosen, he makes the life of the Guardians difficult by trying to prove to the Congregation that they are too young and immature. He also convinced the Congregation that Elyon, the queen and the Light of Meridian, is dangerous and unfit to rule over Metamoor. Many times he tried to get the Guardians to arrest their old friend and bring him the Crown of Light. But W.I.T.C.H. managed to hide Elyon from Endarno by smuggling her back to Earth and had Orube protect her. Moreover, Endarno is someone else than he appears to be...an old enemy coming back for revenge and an even bigger thirst for more power. 
Elyon and Yan Lin discovered that "Endarno" is actually the consciousness and evil will of Prince Phobos, who has been using the physical self of the true Endarno, in his new quest for power and revenge.

Queen Elyon then wields her vital life energy to Yan Lin, who then gives it to Will to hide within the Heart of Kandrakar for safeguarding. The Guardians were able locate the old Oracle, now called Himerish, upon the discovery of his old identity before leaving for Kandrakar, with the help of Orube. Together, they tried to free Elyon from her prison and put a stop to Cedric and Phobos before Endarno (Phobos) is formally instated as the Oracle. In the end, Himerish was able to locate the real Endarno and he, in turn, revealed to the Council that the Endarno that they knew was, in actuality, the malicious Prince Phobos' mind and spirit in his body. Elyon returned to power on her world of Meridian, Cedric was back in the Tower of Mist, and Prince Phobos, rather than being locked up in prison again, threw himself into the endless void of Kandrakar.

Part V: The Book of Elements 
The five classical elements themselves have something in store for the Guardians who utilize and represent them. Each Guardian has discovered new and much stronger abilities, yet their elemental abilities are going out of control. Even the Triumvirate of Kandrakar does not have full understanding about it. At the same time, Cedric is disposed of his magical strength and power and gets a second chance from Oracle Himerish. He returns to "Ye Olde Book Shop" to live a decent life, under supervision from the Guardians. Nevertheless, he searches for a useful resource to regain his powers in hopes of getting revenge on the Guardians. He finds his luck in the Book of Elements, written by Jonathan Ludmoore (which the Guardians later found out). About a century before, Jonathan Ludmoore was an alchemist who came from Metamoor and it was Prince Phobos who had sent him to Heatherfield in order to open the Twelve Portals. After completing his mission, Ludmoore discovered that the city is a place where all five elements—Water, Fire, Earth, Air, Quintessence—met and stayed. He experimented on the elements but it trapped Ludmoore in his own book and released all five elemental stones throughout the city.

After Matt was swallowed by the Book of Elements (thanks to Cedric), the Guardians must cooperate with Cedric in order to save Matt. The book gives them riddles as clues and the Guardians must use these riddles to look for the scattered elemental stones. Endarno warned the Guardians that in order to capture these stones, they must face the Elemental Guards that stand and protect them. One by one, the girls were able to find the stones, and back in the bookstore, Cedric and Orube slowly fell deeply in love. However, the Guardians, Cedric, and Orube were sucked into the world of the book when Will refuses to surrender the Heart of Kandrakar. Cedric was later killed by Ludmoore and dissolved into ink when he tried to protect Orube from Ludmoore's deadly gaze. The Guardians later found Matt and managed to defeat Ludmoore once and for all (with Matt's help). While Orube mourns for Cedric's death Will's mother, Susan Vandom, married her history teacher, Dean Collins. Orube left and a magical portal in the shape of the Heart of Kandrakar later appeared in the basement of the "Ye Olde Book Shop".

Part VI: Ragorlang 
When Hay Lin stayed over at the Lyndons' home, she meets Karl and Tecla Ibsen, an elderly couple who appeared to have a connection with Eric's new school. Karl tells Hay Lin about the Ragorlang, a monster that absorbs the thoughts, the voices, and the sounds of its victims. Coincidentally, a few students at Eric's school are getting inactive as if they had lost their youthful strength. The same evening, Hay Lin gets attacked by a Ragorlang and was saved just in time by the other Guardians. Soon they discover who is behind the new threat: Tecla Ibsen. She wanted to be young and beautiful again and used her magical ability to conjure up and control the Ragorlangs, ordering them to steal the youthful strength of the teenagers by absorbing their thoughts and voices. The Guardians managed to defeat her and her Ragorlang. Unfortunately, Tecla returns, but as a frail, older woman, who cannot summon a fully grown Ragorlang. Tecla brainwashed a magical girl named Erin, making her believe that the Guardians are the Ragorlangs and that it was their fault that her brother, Kader, went missing. At first, Erin uses her magic to make the girls hate each other while posing as an exchange student. The Guardians eventually helped her find her brother despite their hate for her.

This saga also introduced a strange optometrist, named Folkner, who stationed himself in Sheffield to monitor the students' health. The Guardians found out that he is a Ragorlang hunter who wishes to hunt down Tecla Ibsen. She later regain full power due to leaked magics from Kandrakar and attacked the Guardians with a new pact of Ragorlangs. Despite being able to use the Shadow Heart against the Guardians, she was defeated when the last of her Ragorlangs was absorbed into a box created by Folkner. Obsessed with the dark power, Folkner unleashed the powers and became a supreme Ragorlang himself. He was later killed by the Guardians and was sucked into his own Ragorlang box at the end of the saga, and Karl and Tecla were both accepted into the Congregation of Kandrakar after admitting their mistakes.

Part VII: New Power 
The Guardians must face another, more ancient enemy: Dark Mother! She was once Queen Meter of Spring and made flowers bloom beneath her feet. But when she became corrupted, she transformed into "the Dark Mother" and attacked Kandrakar with a vengeance. She was ultimately defeated by the combined strength of the elemental Queens of Water, Fire and Air and was cast into the dark void where she continued to wait patiently in chains until she could be released. In silence, Dark Mother sent a seed and planted it deep within kandrakar, where it would serve as her infiltrator against the Fortress of Light.

The five Guardians of Kandrakar each receive further developed and considerably stronger Guardian powers over the five elements upon undergoing a vision-quest to unlock the very roots of their abilities as well as their highest potential. Matt now serves as their new trainer and mentor after being recruited by the Oracle to prepare them for their upcoming battle against Dark Mother. One by one, the Guardians found the root of their elements and obtained full control over their new and much stronger abilities. Meanwhile, Dark Mother escaped (thanks to Will) and set off to take over Kandrakar. Thanks to her tree, which she had planted beforehand, Dark Mother enslaved the minds of Kandrakar, except for Yan Lin. The Guardians later faced her in one last battle and Dark Mother was sealed in a stone tomb. Oracle Himerish relinquished his place to the original Air Guardian, Yan Lin, who foresaw the incoming threat and departed without even saying goodbye.

In the side story, Susan became pregnant to Dean's child. Issue #80 focuses on the birth of Will's younger half-brother, William Vandom-Collins who happens to possess a little magic of his own.

Part VIII: Teach 2b Witch 
The Guardians must find and teach the magical people of Heatherfield how to fully control their new abilities. Oracle Yan Lin assisted them by giving them new weapons to help greatly strengthen and magnify their powers and abilities as well as the key to the W.I.T.C.H. Van, a special on-the-road-school which houses five magical laboratories connected to each Guardians' elements, personalities, and skills. Kandor, a member of the Congregation is sent to be their new bus driver and care-taker. Meanwhile, a new enemy is watching their every move: Foreman Takeda the CEO and scientist of Takeshita Inc. Takeda vowed to destroy all magic because he believed that it is responsible for his daughter's illness. Mariko, his eldest daughter, discovered the Fast World and her mind now trapped there. Takeda enlisted the help of Liam, a mysterious boy that Mariko met in the Fast World and they fell in love, to spy on the Guardians and ordered him to kidnap Will's little brother. Using Liam and William as bait, Takeda lured the Guardians into his lair and used his cold technologies to trap the Guardians into the 'Fast World forever'. However, his plan was thwarted by his youngest daughter, Shinobu, who saw her father's cruelty and had him frozen by his own robotic minions.

While looking for Liam and William in the Fast World, the Guardians encounter the malicious ruler Arkaam, the White Queen, who wished to rule all of the Fast World under her tyranny and possessed a deep desire to kill the Black Queen. It is revealed that the identity of the Black Queen is Mariko's conscious and Shinobu's sister. In the confusing of their escape, Liam was killed by the White Queen after she stabbed him with her sword. Although successful in bringing William back, Will and her friends are horrified that the White Queen and her army had followed them to their world. In their last battle, invading White Queen and her army were dissipated by the Guardians' powerful sound frequency. After hearing Mariko's accusation and Shinobu's forgiveness, Takeda forgot his vendetta and rejoined his family.

 Beginning from issue #97 onward, most W.I.T.C.H. comic issue is its own story.

Part IX: 100% Witch 
Starting from issue #97 of the previous saga, each issue has its own story. The Guardians now face their daily problems from families, friends, and school. The stories ranged from facing their first day of returning to Sheffield Institute to finding out more about both of their parents' pasts and abilities. At the same time, they must face several new enemies who wanted to destroy them. Many of these villains included the Runics, a group of five evil wizards who control the dark powers of the elements; and Nihila, the Queen of Darkness who desire to weave and control everyone's destinies with her magical Loom. 
The series also introduced new missions where the Guardians must assist the beings of the natural worlds; from listening to the voice of the Earth to helping Mareeve, the Saarineen, avoid marrying the King of the Sharks, Orristurr. Later on, the stories ranged from the girls delivering a letter to the North Pole, Dean's parents visiting the girls and their mothers having lunch together.

Part X: Ladies vs. W.I.T.C.H. 
From issue number 118 onwards, the concept of arcs is dropped. All issues are self-contained stories, though issues 120, 123, and 126 are connected to each other, as the Guardians deals with siblings Lady Giga, Lady Crash and Lady Kimikal, who wanted to steal their energies. Issues 128 and 129 are also connected as it focuses on Will and Matt's fight.

Part XI: Magical Sovereigns 
From issue 130 through issue 139, the saga has been named the "Magical Sovereigns", with individual stories. Elyon the Queen of Meridian returns to Kandakar in this saga, giving away missions to the Guardians in order for them to become Magical Sovereigns. Oracle Himerish also returns at Issue 139.

Special issues 
Aside from the original series, the Walt Disney Company Italia had published several special issues depicting the lives of the Guardians and their friends taking places on the side lines from the original canon issues. The following is a list of special issues that have been published thus far:

 The Year Before
 Elyon: Return of the Queen
 Cornelia and Caleb: A Love Not Meant to Be
 Core of Kandrakar
 Planet Boys
 Orube Special
 Two Hearts for a Ball: World Cup Special
 Christmas Special 2004
 Christmas Special 2005
 Christmas Special 2006
 W.I.T.C.H. Look Book
 Caleb and Elyon - Two Destinies
 W.I.T.C.H. on Stage
 Halloween Special 2007
 Olympic Games 2008 Special
 Night of Magic

Reception

Sales 
In 2004, The Walt Disney Company announced that the W.I.T.C.H. comic book series was available in more than 60 countries, with more than 1 million copies of the comic book series being sold every month. In France and Germany, more than 100 000 copies were sold monthly. In Italy, more than 200 000 copies were sold every month. The company revealed that the W.I.T.C.H. comic book series sold more than 20 million copies worldwide and generated more than 100 million dollars. By January 2005, W.I.T.C.H. had been released in over 65 countries. Angelo Delos Trinos of CBR.com called the comic book series a "massive success" in Scandinavia.

Accolades 
In 2004, the W.I.T.C.H. comic book series won the Max & Moritz Prize for Best German-language Comic/Comic-related Publication: For Children and Young People.

Other printed media
After the success of the 2001 release of the W.I.T.C.H. comic magazines, Disney Publishing Worldwide expanded the W.I.T.C.H. franchise.

Chapter books
The W.I.T.C.H. book series consists of twenty-six books; all are adapted from the comic series by either Elizabeth Lenhard or Alice Alfonsi, but have entirely different titles than those of the graphic novel series. Each contains comic inserts from the original comics. The book series was designed for UK and USA release and preceded the graphic novel adaptation in the United States.

 The Power of Five (Elizabeth Lenhard)
 The Disappearance (Elizabeth Lenhard)
 Finding Meridian (Elizabeth Lenhard)
 The Fire of Friendship (Elizabeth Lenhard)
 The Last Tear (Elizabeth Lenhard)
 Illusions and Lies (Elizabeth Lenhard)
 The Light of Meridian (Julie Komorn)
 Out of the Dark (Julie Komorn)
 The Four Dragons (Elizabeth Lenhard)
 A Bridge Between Worlds (Alice Alfonsi)
 The Crown of Light (Elizabeth Lenhard)
 The Return of a Queen (Elizabeth Lenhard)
 A Different Path (Elizabeth Lenhard)
 Worlds Apart (Alice Alfonsi)
 The Courage to Choose (Alice Alfonsi)
 Path of Revenge (Alice Alfonsi)
 The Darkest Dream (Alice Alfonsi)
 Keeping Hope (Alice Alfonsi)
 The Other Truth (Alice Alfonsi)
 Whispers of Doubt (Alice Alfonsi)
 A Weakened Heart (Alice Alfonsi)
 A Choice is Made (Alice Alfonsi)
 Farewell to Love (Alice Alfonsi)
 Trust Your Heart (Alice Alfonsi)
 Enchanted Waters (Alice Alfonsi)
 Friends Forever (Alice Alfonsi)

Original Adventures
A miniseries of five chapter books were produced in 2004 and 2005, each one featuring one of the five Guardians of the Veil narrating her own story in fighting a certain antagonist relating to one of them, or ancient evil being, with her four fellow Guardians. The second book, told in the eyes of Irma Lair, has not been available at either Amazon or any other book stores; said to be the only out of print.
When Lightning Strikes (by Will Vandom, Energy Guardian and Keeper of the Heart of Candracar)
Enchanted Music (by Irma Lair, Water Guardian)
Heartbreak Island (by Taranee Cook Fire Guardian)
Stolen Spring (by Cornelia Hale, Earth Guardian)
The Cruel Empress (by Hay Lin, Air Guardian)

Graphic novels 
Eight graphic novels were published by Hyperion Books in the United States. They were first released in 2005, each of them containing two issues from the comic book series. Included in every graphic novel was a miniature poster relating to the W.I.T.C.H. franchise. The titles of the graphic novels are as follows:

 The Power of Friendship (Halloween and The Twelve Portals)
 Meridian Magic (The Dark Dimension and The Power of Fire)
 The Revealing (So Be It Forever and Illusions and Lies)
 Between Light and Dark (One Day You'll Meet Him and The Black Roses of Meridian)
 Legends Revealed (The Four Dragons and A Bridge Between Worlds)
 Forces of Change (The Crown of Light and The Challenge of Phobos)
 Under Pressure (I Know Who You Are and The End of a Dream)
 An Unexpected Return (The Courage to Choose and Nerissa's Seal).

Yen Press republication
In 2017, Yen Press announced at the San Diego Comic-Con that they would be reprinting the comics as W.I.T.C.H.: The Graphic Novel with new translations and will be releasing new graphic novels in the series for every 4 months beginning with the first story arc of the comic book series on Halloween. Each volume contains 3 or 4 chapters of the original comic, plus a few pages of additional content from the original magazines such as character profiles, bedrooms and wardrobes, information on various locations in the series, and how-to-draws. The books were published by Disney Comics in JY imprint. The following volumes, with some chapter names changed from the original release, have been published or announced so far:

Manga 

The two volumes were also published in Italy and Eastern Europe by the Italian Disney Manga.

Welcome Magazine 
Welcome is a side magazine of W.I.T.C.H. In total, there are eleven issues of the magazine. It is only published in parts of Europe, and is not published in the UK or Australia. Its mascot is We, a creature from Basilíade. Welcome was included with the Italian W.I.T.C.H. magazine, starting with issue #64. The Swedish W.I.T.C.H. magazine started publishing Welcome stories much earlier, instead of publishing a separate magazine.

Lene Kaaberbøl 
Danish author Lene Kaaberbøl has written nine novels set in the W.I.T.C.H. universe, which have been published in 2002 and 2003 in Denmark. The first five of them each have one of the five girls as the main character in the order of the first letters in their names (Will, Irma, Taranee, Cornelia, and Hay Lin).

 When Lightning Strikes (The Heart of the Salamander)
 Enchanted Music (The Music of the Silencer)
 Heartbreak Island (The Fire of the Ocean)
 Stolen Spring (Green Magic)
 The Cruel Empress (The Gruesome Empress)

Her next series of W.I.T.C.H. pockets is called Crystal Birds. It contains the following titles:
 The Stone Falcon
 The Talons of the Eagle
 The Shadow of the Owl
 The Golden Phoenix

Scandinavian releases 
Books that have been released in The Czech Republic, Norway, Sweden, Finland, Germany, Denmark, Poland, Romania and Russia.

Ruben Eliassen
 Ibenholt Pyramiden (The Ebony Pyramid)
Josefine Ottesen
 Isblomsten (The Iceflower) 2004
 Den Gyldne Kilde (The Golden Spring) 2005
Maud Mangold
Queen of the Night
The Flame of Clarity
Lene Møller Jørgensen
The Pristine Rose
A Touch of a Star
Cecilie Eken
The Wells of Fog
The Storms of Windmor

Audiovisual media

TV series

Video game

Soundtrack 
A soundtrack album for the series was released in 2007: Music From and Inspired By W.I.T.C.H. Among other tracks inspired by the series, it includes full-length renditions of the first international TV series theme as well as the US version.

The song "The Power of Five" by Jillian Escobosa was used for promotional material and official websites prior to the TV series' launch. An official music video, featuring 3D models of the main characters and airing on MTV in Italy in 2007, was created by Marco Pavone for "W.I.T.C.H. Is In the House".

References

 
Comics adapted into animated series
Comics adapted into video games
Disney Publishing Worldwide
Italian comics titles
Yen Press titles